The 1996 United States presidential election in Nevada took place on November 5, 1996, as part of the 1996 United States presidential election. Voters chose four representatives, or electors to the Electoral College, who voted for president and vice president.

A swing state, Nevada was narrowly won by incumbent Democratic President Bill Clinton. Clinton took a 43.93% plurality of the popular vote over Republican challenger Bob Dole, who took 42.91%, a victory margin of 1.02%. Reform Party candidate Ross Perot finished in third, with 9.47% of the popular vote.

, this is the last presidential election in which any candidate won Nevada without carrying Washoe County, and the last time Mineral County voted Democratic. It is also the only time since 1960 that Nevada did not vote for the same candidate as Colorado. Clinton became the first ever Democrat to win the White House without carrying White Pine County.

Results

Results by county

See also
United States presidential elections in Nevada

References

Nevada
1996
1996 Nevada elections